The 1963 VIR National Cup was a sports car race held April 28, 1963, at Virginia International Raceway. It was the second event of the thirteenth season of the Sports Car Club of America's National Sports Car Championship.

Results
Cars were separated into fourteen classes based on engine displacement and production numbers.  The first race; for cars in F, G, and H Production and H Modified; was won by Jack Crusoe in an F Production Alfa Romeo Giulietta.  The second race; for cars in C, D, and E Production; was won by Paul Richards in a C Production Fiat-Abarth 1000.  The third race; for G Modified, Formula Junior, and Formula Three cars; was won by Charlie Hayes in a Formula Junior Elva.

Race Four: C & E Modified, A & B Production

References

External links
"Corvette News" magazine, 1963
"Sports Car Graphic" magazine July, 1963
World Sports Racing Protoytypes
RacingSportsCars.com
V.I.R. History

Vir
Vir National Cup
VIR 240